was a Japanese figure skater who mostly competed in singles. She was a seven-time Japanese national champion and represented Japan at the 1936 Winter Olympics at the age of 12.

Competitive highlights

References

External links
 

Japanese female single skaters
Figure skaters at the 1936 Winter Olympics
Olympic figure skaters of Japan
1924 births
2003 deaths
Sportspeople from Osaka